Carpoxylon macrospermum is a species of palm tree endemic to Vanuatu, and the only species in the genus Carpoxylon.

It is an IUCN Red List Critically endangered species, threatened by habitat loss.

Taxonomy
This palm was first described by Hermann Wendland and Carl Georg Oscar Drude in 1875 in Linnaea.

References

Further reading

Carpoxylinae
Endemic flora of Vanuatu
Trees of Vanuatu
Critically endangered flora of Oceania
Monotypic Arecaceae genera
Taxonomy articles created by Polbot
Plants described in 1875
Taxa named by Hermann Wendland
Taxa named by Carl Georg Oscar Drude